Plastik (German for Plastic (das Plastik) or Sculpture (die Plastik)) is the sixth studio album by German rock band Oomph!. With this album, the band changed its style to feature less aggressive instruments and vocals, more pronounced synthesizer riffs, overall softer vocals and progressed drumming and guitar playing, as well as uncommon time signatures. This melody-over-aggression approach would be the style the band would adopt for their signature sound, making this album a turning point in the band's sound.

Track listing
 Das weisse Licht (The White Light) - 4:01
 Kennst du mich? (Do You Know Me?) - 4:44
 Scorn - 4:01
 Keine Luft mehr (No Air Left) - 3:59
 Hunger - 4:11
 Nothing Is Real - 4:00
 Mein Traum (My Dream) - 4:34
 Always - 3:46
 Goldenes Herz (Golden Heart) - 4:30
 I Come Alive - 4:23
 Fieber (featuring Nina Hagen) (Fever) - 4:13
 My Own Private Prison - 4:13
 Das weisse Licht (Refraction) - 1:56

Music videos
 Fieber
 Das weisse Licht

Oomph! albums
1999 albums
Virgin Records albums
German-language albums